Saint FM 94.7 was a radio station serving the South Atlantic island of Saint Helena. The station's studios and administration offices were located at Association Hall, Main Street, Jamestown. It was the only independent radio station broadcasting on Saint Helena, and was also the island's only FM station.

The station also broadcast via the Internet and was relayed by stations in Ascension Island and the Falkland Islands. The organisation also produces a weekly newspaper, the St Helena Independent which continues despite the closure of SaintFM.

The managing director of the station was Mikael Olsson.

The radio channels vacated by Saint FM have been taken over by Saint FM Community Radio. Also Saint Fm 94.7 closed down on 31 April 2018 at midnight.

History
Saint FM was started by Johnny Drummond, whose bequest provided the initial funding for the station. Talks about the new station began in August 2003 between Drummond and the current station manager of Saint FM, Mike Olsson. Negotiations started soon afterwards and the broadcasting licence was issued on 22 July 2004.

The station commenced test transmissions on the Internet on 28 September 2004, and on FM via a temporary aerial on 27 September 2004.

After three months of test transmissions Saint FM officially opened with scheduled broadcasts on 3 January 2005.

In June 2006 broadcasts commenced in Ascension Island on 91.4 MHz, locally re-broadcast by VT Merlin Communications.

On 1 September 2006 Saint FM began broadcasting to Stanley on the Falkland Islands on 95.5 MHz. The re-broadcast service was provided by KTV Ltd on the Falkland Islands under the title 'KTV Radio Nova Saint FM', and was extended to cover residents in the vicinity of RAF Mount Pleasant.

The station closed on 21 December 2012.

Closure 
Saint FM posted the following on Wednesday 19 December 2012 on its Facebook page:

SaintFM closed down at 4p.m. on 21 December 2012.  After a brief speech from the station's owner, Mikael Olsson, the final record played was The Carnival Is Over by The Seekers.  Then the transmitter was switched off.

Programmes
The majority of programming was music-based with a significant number of requests being played for islanders from relatives and friends overseas and vice versa.

As befits the musical preference of the many Saint Helenians much country music was played, but most popular music styles from the last 50 years were featured.

Weekday daytime programmes were usually presented by station staff, with evenings and weekends programming done by 'voluntary presenters'.
'Local news' (which also included events on Ascension Island and the Falkland Islands) was broadcast throughout the day. The station also did international news bulletins as well as international and local sports updates throughout the day.

The programming style could best be described as 'informal'.

Many of the station's requests were placed by 'Saints' contacting relatives worldwide.

As a commercial station, Saint FM played adverts for local businesses. Some of these are still available online.

Saint Helena Frequencies
Although Saint Helena is a small island its terrain is such that island-wide coverage requires more than one transmitter.

The main island transmitter was at High Knoll Fort, and radiated on 93.1 MHz.  From this were also fed:
 a relay at The Flag, for the Levelwood area, opened July 2007, which operated on 95.1 MHz.
 a relay for the Blue Hill and Barren Ground area, on 91.1 MHz from the Head 'O Wain TV transmitter site.

The High Knoll Fort transmitter was itself fed from a transmitter located at the studios in Jamestown, which radiated on 106.7 MHz.  This transmitter also provided a service in Jamestown.

FM DX
Because of its remoteness Saint FM was interested to hear from people who could receive the station at unusually long distances, for example in Africa or at sea, direct from its main 93.1 MHz FM transmitter on Saint Helena.

References

External links
 Station Website at www.saint.fm (now taken over by Saint FM Community Radio)
 St. Helena Independent (Newspaper)
 Featured in the World Radio TV Handbook

 

Radio stations in Saint Helena
2004 establishments in Saint Helena and Dependencies
Radio stations established in 2004
2012 disestablishments in Saint Helena and Dependencies
Radio stations disestablished in 2012
Defunct radio stations in the United Kingdom
Jamestown, Saint Helena